Martin Farm Complex is a historic home and farm complex located at Lima in Livingston County, New York. The complex consists of a gentleman farmer's Italian villa farmhouse along with a full complement of contributing agricultural outbuildings.  In addition to the farmhouse, there are eleven contributing buildings, two structures, one site, and four objects dating from the mid-19th century to the 1930s.  They include a brick office building, milk house, sheds, privy, carriage barn, chicken house, four barns, a pergola, smoke house, cast iron fence, stepping stone, and two hitching posts.

It was listed on the National Register of Historic Places in 1989.

References

Houses on the National Register of Historic Places in New York (state)
Italianate architecture in New York (state)
Houses in Livingston County, New York
National Register of Historic Places in Livingston County, New York